Anthurium bonplandii is a species of plant in the genus Anthurium native to South America. A member of the Anthurium sect. Pachyneurium, it grows terrestrially or occasionally epiphytic or epilithic. It is often confused with Anthurium jenmanii when young and Anthurium atropurpureum.

Subspecies 
There are several accepted subspecies.

 Anthurium bonplandii subsp. bonplandii, ranging from southeastern Colombia through Venezuela and Brazil
 Anthurium bonplandii subsp. guayanum, native to Venezuela, Guyana, and Suriname
 Anthurium bonplandii subsp. cuatrecasii, which grows from southeastern Colombia to western Venezuela, often on rocks

References

bonplandii
Plants described in 1975